John Marshall Rose (May 18, 1856 – April 22, 1923) was a Republican member of the U.S. House of Representatives from Pennsylvania.

Biography
John Marshall Rose was born in Johnstown, Pennsylvania, a son of Wesley J. Rose and Martha Given.  He graduated from Washington & Jefferson College in Washington, Pennsylvania, in 1880.  He taught school.  He studied law, was admitted to the bar in 1884 and commenced practice in Johnstown.  He was a member of the Pennsylvania State House of Representatives in 1889, but declined reelection. During his term he acquired the nickname "the whistling statesman" for his habit of whistling popular songs.

Rose was elected as a Republican to the Sixty-fifth, Sixty-sixth, and Sixty-seventh Congresses. He declined to be a candidate for renomination in 1922. He died in Washington, D.C., on April 22, 1923. He is interred in Grandview Cemetery, Johnstown.

References

Further reading

The Political Graveyard

External links
 

Republican Party members of the Pennsylvania House of Representatives
Pennsylvania lawyers
Washington & Jefferson College alumni
Politicians from Johnstown, Pennsylvania
1856 births
1923 deaths
Republican Party members of the United States House of Representatives from Pennsylvania
19th-century American lawyers